Yoshitsugu is a masculine Japanese given name.

Possible writings
Yoshitsugu can be written using different combinations of kanji characters. Here are some examples: 

義次, "justice, next"
義嗣, "justice, succession"
義継, "justice, continue"
吉次, "good luck,filial piety"
吉嗣, "good luck, succession"
吉継, "good luck, continue"
善次, "virtuous, next"
善嗣, "virtuous, succession"
善継, "virtuous, continue"
喜次, "rejoice, next"
喜嗣, "rejoice, succession"
喜継, "rejoice, continue"
芳次, "fragrant/virtuous, next"
芳嗣, "fragrant/virtuous, succession"
芳継, "fragrant/virtuous, continue"
好次, "good/like something, next"
喜次, "rejoice, next"
慶次, "congratulate, next"

The name can also be written in hiragana よしつぐ or katakana ヨシツグ.

Notable people with the name

Yoshitsugu Nihonmatsu (二本松 義継, 1552–1586), Japanese daimyō of the Sengoku period, 14th head of the Nihonmatsu clan of Mutsu
Yoshitsugu Maeba (前波 吉継, 1541–1574), retainer beneath the clan of Asakura throughout the late Sengoku period of Feudal Japan
Yoshitsugu Miyoshi (三好 義継, 1549–1573), samurai of the Sengoku period who was practically the last head of Miyoshi clan
Yoshitsugu Otani (大谷 吉継, 1559–1600), Japanese samurai of the Sengoku period though Azuchi-Momoyama Period
Yoshitsugu Tokugawa (徳川 慶臧, 1836–1849), Japanese daimyō of the Edo period, who ruled the Owari Domain
Yoshitsugu Yamashita (山下 義韶, 1865–1935), first 10th dan judoka
Yoshitsugu Harada (原田 令嗣, born 1952), Japanese politician of the Liberal Democratic Party, a member of the House of Representatives in the Diet
Yoshitsugu Matsuoka (松岡 禎丞, born 1986) Japanese voice actor from Hokkaido, Japan.
Yoshitsugu Saito (斎藤 義次, 1890–1944), lieutenant general in the Imperial Japanese Army during World War II

Japanese masculine given names